Para Las Madrecitas is the first collaborative album released in 1974 by Al Hurricane and Tiny Morrie, it is written to their mother Bennie Sanchez. The album is not the first time Al and Morrie recorded a together, they used to record together as "Al Hurricane & the Night Rockers". It is the sixth full-length album released by Al Hurricane.

Track listing

References

Al Hurricane albums
New Mexico music albums
1974 albums